Esty may refer to:

Surname 
Alexander Rice Esty (1826–1881), American architect
Alice Esty (soprano) (1864–1935), American-born operatic soprano
Alice Swanson Esty (1904–2000), American actress, soprano and arts patron
Constantine C. Esty (1824–1912), member of the United States House of Representatives from Massachusetts
Daniel C. Esty (born 1959), Commissioner of the Connecticut Department of Energy and Environmental Protection
Donald Esty, Jr., American politician from Maine
Edward S. Esty (1824–1890), American politician from New York
Elizabeth Esty (born 1959), member of the United States House of Representatives from Connecticut
Kim Esty, Canadian musician
L. D. Esty or Lee. D. Esty (1875–1943), American architect
William Esty (1895–1954), American advertising executive

Given name 
Esty Amukwaya, Namibian footballer
Esty Chaney (1891–1952), relief pitcher in Major League Baseball

English feminine given names